An affair is a sexual relationship, romantic friendship, or passionate attachment in which at least one of its participants has a formal or informal commitment to a third person who may neither agree to such relationship nor even be aware of it.

Romantic affair

A romantic affair, also called an affair of the heart, may refer to a sexual liaison or more emotional relationship between two people who may have sex without expecting a more formal romantic relationship, an affair is by its nature romantic.

The term affair may also describe part of an agreement within an open marriage or open relationship, such as swinging, dating, or polyamory, in which some forms of sex with one's non-primary partner(s) are permitted and other forms are not. Participants in open relationships, including unmarried couples and polyamorous families, may consider sanctioned affairs the norm, but when a non-sanctioned affair occurs, it is described as infidelity and maybe experienced as adultery, or a betrayal both of trust and integrity, even though to most people it would not be considered illicit.

When romantic affairs lack both overt and covert sexual behavior, yet exhibit intense or enduring emotional intimacy, it may also be referred to as an emotional affair, platonic love, or a romantic friendship.

Extramarital affair 

Extramarital affairs are relationships outside of marriage where an illicit romantic or sexual relationship or a romantic friendship or passionate attachment occurs.

An affair can continue in one form or another for years, even as one of the partners in that affair passes through marriage, divorce, and remarriage. This could be considered the primary relationship, with the marriage secondary to it. Several people claim the reason for an extramarital affair is their unsuccessful marriage where both spouses fail to please each other. This may be serial polygamy or other forms of nonmonogamy.

The ability to pursue serial and clandestine extramarital affairs while safeguarding other secrets and conflict of interest inherent in the practice, requires skill in deception and duplicitous negotiation. Even to hide one affair requires a degree of skill or malicious gaslighting. All these behaviors are more usually called lying.

Deception can be defined as the "covert manipulation of perception to alter thoughts, feelings, or beliefs". The presence of deception may indicate the degree to which the deceiver has breached fundamental conditions of fidelity, reciprocal vulnerability, and transparency. Sometimes these are explicit or assumed pre-conditions of a committed intimate relationship.

Individuals having affairs with married men or women can be prosecuted for adultery in some jurisdictions and can be sued by the jilted spouses in others, or named as 'co-respondents' in divorce proceedings. As of 2009, eight U.S.  states permitted such alienation of affections lawsuits. Affairs with the consent of their significant others may not be considered infidelity or adultery.

Online affair
The appearance of computer-mediated communication introduces a new type of communication and consequently a new type of "affair". There are various kinds of computer-mediated communication that differ in some significant aspects: one-to-one or group communication formats, interrelating with anonymous or identified people and communicating in synchronous or asynchronous formats. Online affairs combine features of close and remote relationships.

Ben Ze'ef argues that an online affair is a unique kind of affair—termed "detached attachment", or just "detachment"—that includes opposing features whose presence in a face-to-face affair would be paradoxical. Like direct, face-to-face affairs, online affairs can be spontaneous and casual and show intensive personal involvement. However, online affairs can also be more of a planned discourse than spontaneous talk; like written letters, online messages can be stored and thus have a permanent presence, which is absent from face-to-face affairs.

People participating in online affairs may be strangers to each other in the sense that they have never actually met each other. However, they are also close to each other since they share intimate information. In online affairs, people try to enjoy the benefits of both close and remote affairs, while avoiding their flaws. People enjoy the highly valued products of close affairs while paying the low cost of remote affairs. As one woman wrote: 'He constantly told me that he can not provide me with what I would want and I would always respond with: "I'm not asking anything from you, but simply enjoy your company"'.

Famous affairs

 Affair of the Diamond Necklace
 Hamilton–Reynolds affair
 Eulenburg affair
 Haijby scandal
 Iris Robinson scandal
 Clinton–Lewinsky scandal
 The Makropulos Affair (play)
 The Makropulos Affair (opera)
 Munsinger affair
 Profumo affair
 Spiegel affair
 Eliot Spitzer prostitution scandal
 John Edwards extramarital affair
 Mark Sanford extramarital affair

See also
 Ashley Madison
 Courtly love
 Crime of passion
 Family therapy
 On-again, off-again relationship
 Polysexuality
 Scandal
 Love triangle
 Adultery

References

Further reading
 Schmitt, D. P., et al. (2004). Patterns and universals of mate poaching across 53 nations: The effects of sex, culture, and personality on romantically attracting another person's partner. Journal of Personality and Social Psychology, 86, 560–584.

External links

United States Conference of Catholic Bishops, "Infidelity"

Politics by issue
Sexual fidelity
Extramarital relationships